Joshua Stangby (born September 24, 1990) is a Canadian football wide receiver who is a free agent. He played college football for the Ottawa Braves. He has also been a member of the Atlanta Falcons and Indianapolis Colts of the National Football League (NFL), and the Portland Steel of the Arena Football League (AFL).

Professional career

NFL and AFL 
Stangby was signed by the Atlanta Falcons as an undrafted free agent on May 6, 2015 but was released four days later. Stangby signed a contract with the Portland Steel on December 11, 2015 after an open tryout with the team. He was signed by the Indianapolis Colts on December 22, 2015. On August 28, 2016, Stangby was waived by the Colts.

CFL 
Stangby signed with the Ottawa Redblacks of the Canadian Football League (CFL) on October 11, 2016, near the end of the 2016 season. He was moved on and off the practice roster for the duration of the teams journey to the 104th Grey Cup game. Stangby made it onto the Redblacks 2017 season opening roster, and scored his first CFL touchdown on opening weekend against the Calgary Stampeders. Stangby finished his second year in the CFL with 41 receptions for 478 yards with 5 touchdowns in 13 games. Stangby was released by the Redblacks on April 3, 2018.

Stangby re-signed with the Edmonton Football Team on a contract extension through 2021 on December 26, 2020. He was released on June 28, 2021.

References

1990 births
American football wide receivers
Living people
Portland Steel players
Ottawa Braves football players
Atlanta Falcons players
Indianapolis Colts players
Players of American football from Los Angeles
Ottawa Redblacks players
Canadian football wide receivers
American players of Canadian football
Glendale Vaqueros football players
North Hollywood High School alumni
Edmonton Elks players
Players of Canadian football from Los Angeles